Alfred Galichon (born May 4, 1977) is a French economist and mathematician. His work focuses on quantitative economics and econometrics. He is a professor of economics and of mathematics at New York University.

Life and work
Galichon was born in Paris. He is a professor at New York University in the Courant Institute, and the director of NYU Paris. Previously, he had been a full professor at Ecole Polytechnique, and then at Sciences Po, Paris. He is a graduate of Ecole Polytechnique and Corps des Mines, and holds a PhD in Economics from Harvard University.

His work lies within quantitative economics, in particular on the economic applications of optimal transport. He has contributed to the econometrics of matching markets, discrete choice models, martingale optimal transport, and quantile regression.

He is a fellow of the Econometric Society and the author of Optimal Transport Methods in Economics.

Research
Galichon is the author of more than forty peer-reviewed articles. His research has been funded by the National Science Foundation (2017-2020) and twice by the European Research Council, for a total amount of approximately 3 million Euros.

Awards and distinctions
Edmond Malinvaud Prize from the French Association of Economic Sciences, 2015.
Starting grant, European Research Council, 2013-2016.
'Young Leader' of the French-American Foundation, 2018.
Economic Theory Fellow, 2019.
Fellow of the Econometric Society, 2020.
Consolidator grant, European Research Council, 2020-2025.

Selected publications

Books

Articles

References

External links
Personal website
NYU Department of Economics profile
NYU Department of Mathematics profile

French economists
21st-century French mathematicians
1977 births
Living people
New York University faculty
École Polytechnique alumni
Mines Paris - PSL alumni
Harvard Graduate School of Arts and Sciences alumni
Fellows of the Econometric Society
French expatriates in the United States